The wren-like rushbird (Phleocryptes melanops) is a species of bird in the family Furnariidae. It is only species placed in the genus Phleocryptes. It is found in Argentina, Bolivia, Brazil, Chile, Paraguay, Peru, and Uruguay. Its natural habitat is swamps.

Within the ovenbird family, the wren-like rushbird is genetically most closely related to the curve-billed reedhaunter (Limnornis curvirostris).

Four subspecies are recognised:
 P. m. brunnescens Zimmer, JT, 1935 – coastal west Peru
 P. m. schoenobaenus Cabanis & Heine, 1860 – central, south Peru, west Bolivia and northwest Argentina
 P. m. loaensis Philippi Bañados & Goodall, 1946 – coastal south Peru and north Chile
 P. m. melanops (Vieillot, 1817) – south Brazil to central Chile and central Argentina

References

External links
Image at ADW
Photo of wren-like rushbird in southern Brazil

wren-like rushbird
Birds of Peru
Birds of Chile
Birds of Argentina
Birds of Uruguay
wren-like rushbird
Taxa named by Louis Jean Pierre Vieillot
Taxonomy articles created by Polbot